Adam Keith Watt (born 10 November 1967) is an Australian former boxer and kickboxer. He has studied kickboxing, Seido-kaikan karate, and boxing. His nickname was "Lights Out" because of his high level karate and boxing skills, and one punch knock out power. He has won many world kickboxing titles, and reached as high as 10th in the highly respected World Boxing Council's & World Boxing Organisation's (W.B.C & WBO) Cruiserweight ratings. In 2000, he challenged WBO cruiserweight champion Johnny Nelson for his title. Watt holds the notable distinction of being the first athlete to fight for world Karate, kickboxing and boxing titles.

Watt won the Australian Cruiserweight title in March 2000 in the ANBF "Fight of the Year" against Victorian Tosca Petridis, and was the first Australian to win the Commonwealth Cruiserweight Boxing title. Adam also achieved success in Japan's K-1 Kickboxing tournaments, winning K-1 Oceania, knocking out highly regarded South African Mike Bernardo in 2001 amongst other great victories.

Arrest and assault and fight for justice 
In September 2008, Watt was arrested for conspiring to import chemical precursors to the drug methamphetamine. While Watt was on remand awaiting trial, he was hit from behind with a sandwich toaster inside a pillow case. When ambulance officers reached Watt he was clinically dead, but they managed to revive him at the scene. The extent of his injuries has not been made public. Following the attempt on his life, Adam was held in maximum security conditions and denied urgent medical treatment for nearly one year. His condition continued to deteriorate until eventually a brain injury specialist was brought to the jail to examine him. A Magistrate later described his untreated injuries as "life-threatening".

Upon his release, whilst undergoing medical treatment, Adam embarked on what one legal practitioner described in court as "a crusade" to not only defend himself and uncover the identity of those truly responsible for the crime for which he had been charged, but also to have the Australian Human Rights Commission hold NSW Corrective Services accountable for his mistreatment. In 2014 Adam was found unfit to stand trial on the import charge and the Crown withdrew the Supply charge.

Adam Watt won compensation.

Career 
Kickboxing
2002 K-1 World Grand Prix Preliminary Melbourne Champion
2001 K-1 World Grand Prix in Fukuoka Repechage B Runner-Up
2001 K-1 World Grand Prix in Osaka Runner-Up
2000 ISKA World International Rules Light Cruiserweight Champion
1997 ISKA World Muay Thai Light Cruiserweight Champion
1995 Shoot Boxing World Heavyweight Champion
1993 UKF World Cruiserweight Champion
WKA World Cruiserweight Champion
Boxing
2000-01 British Commonwealth Cruiserweight Champion
2000 Australian Cruiserweight Champion
1999-00 OPBF Cruiserweight Champion (1 title defense)
1999 OBA Cruiserweight Champion (1 title defense)
1997-98 PABA Cruiserweight Champion

Boxing record 

|-
|-  bgcolor="#FFBBBB"
| 2001-02-17 || Loss ||align=left| Sebastiaan Rothmann || Carnival City Casino || Brakpen, South Africa || KO || 8 (12) || || 14-4
|-
! style=background:white colspan=9 |
|-
|-  bgcolor="#FFBBBB"
| 2000-10-07 || Loss ||align=left| Johnny Nelson || Doncaster Dome || Doncaster, England, UK || KO || 5 (12) || 2:12 || 14-3
|-
! style=background:white colspan=9 |
|-
|-  bgcolor="#CCFFCC"
| 2000-06-24 || Win ||align=left| Bruce Scott || Hampden Park || Glasgow, Scotland, UK || TKO || 4 (12) || || 14-2
|-
! style=background:white colspan=9 |
|-
|-  bgcolor="#CCFFCC"
| 2000-03-24 || Win ||align=left| Tosca Petridis || Hornsby RSL Club || Sydney, Australia || TKO || 7 (12) || 2:36 || 13-2
|-
! style=background:white colspan=9 |
|-
|-  bgcolor="#CCFFCC"
| 2000-02-04 || Win ||align=left| Caine Melbourne || Star City Casino || Sydney, Australia || KO || 3 (8) || || 12-2
|-
|-  bgcolor="#CCFFCC"
| 1999-10-16 || Win ||align=left| Lightning Lupe || Omnisports Stadium || Nouméa, New Caledonia || TKO || 4 (12) || || 11-2
|-
! style=background:white colspan=9 |
|-
|-  bgcolor="#CCFFCC"
| 1999-09-17 || Win ||align=left| Mosese Sorovi || Manly Warringah Leagues Club || Sydney, Australia || TKO || 1 (12) || 2:04 || 10-2
|-
! style=background:white colspan=9 |
|-
|-  bgcolor="#CCFFCC"
| 1999-08-05 || Win ||align=left| Phil Gregory || Willoughby Town Hall || Sydney, Australia || KO || 2 (6) || || 9-2
|-
|-  bgcolor="#FFBBBB"
| 1999-03-15 || Loss ||align=left| Wayne Braithwaite || Star City Casino || Sydney, Australia || KO || 1 (12) || 2:37 || 8-2
|-
! style=background:white colspan=9 |
|-
|-  bgcolor="#CCFFCC"
| 1999-01-16 || Win ||align=left| Phil Gregory || Alexandria Basketball Stadium || Sydney, Australia || TKO || 3 (12) || || 8-1
|-
! style=background:white colspan=9 |
|-
|-  bgcolor="#CCFFCC"
| 1998-08-27 || Win ||align=left| Simon Whiu || South Sydney Junior Rugby League Club || Sydney, Australia || KO || 3 || || 7-1
|-
|-  bgcolor="#FFBBBB"
| 1998-04-05 || Loss ||align=left| Valeriy Vykhor || Newcastle Entertainment Centre || Newcastle, Australia || TKO || 1 (12) || || 6-1
|-
! style=background:white colspan=9 |
|-
|-  bgcolor="#CCFFCC"
| 1998-02-28 || Win ||align=left| Dean Turvey || Parramatta RSL Club || Sydney, Australia || KO || 2 (10) || 2:43 || 6-0
|-
|-  bgcolor="#CCFFCC"
| 1997-12-06 || Win ||align=left| Kevin Wagstaff || Stockland Stadium || Townsville, Australia || KO || 1 (12) || 2:36 || 5-0
|-
! style=background:white colspan=9 |
|-
|-  bgcolor="#CCFFCC"
| 1997-09-12 || Win ||align=left| Nat Ledua || Manly Warringah Leagues Club || Sydney, Australia || KO || 1 (10) || 1:55 || 4-0
|-
|-  bgcolor="#CCFFCC"
| 1997-05-02 || Win ||align=left| Joe Kiwi Kingi || Dee Why RSL Club || Sydney, Australia || TKO || 3 (10) || 1:58 || 3-0
|-
|-  bgcolor="#CCFFCC"
| 1997-02-10 || Win ||align=left| Ernie Valentine || Memorial Auditorium || Sacramento, California, USA || KO || 1 || || 2-0
|-
|-  bgcolor="#CCFFCC"
| 1996-11-22 || Win ||align=left| Phil Gregory || Manly Warringah Leagues Club || Sydney, Australia || KO || 1 (8) || || 1-0
|-
! style=background:white colspan=9 |
|-
|-
| colspan=9 | Legend:

Kickboxing record 

|-
|-  bgcolor="#FFBBBB"
| 2002-10-11 || Loss ||align=left| Gurkan Ozkan ||  || Sydney, Australia || Decision (Unanimous) || 6 || 2:00
|-
|-  bgcolor="#FFBBBB"
| 2002-08-17 || Loss ||align=left| Pavel Majer || K-1 World Grand Prix 2002 in Las Vegas Quarterfinals || Las Vegas, Nevada, USA || Decision (Unanimous) || 3 || 3:00
|-
|-  bgcolor="#CCFFCC"
| 2002-02-18 || Win ||align=left| Andrew Peck || K-1 World Grand Prix 2002 Preliminary Melbourne Final || Melbourne, Australia || KO || 1 || 1:50
|-
! style=background:white colspan=9 |
|-
|-  bgcolor="#CCFFCC"
| 2002-02-18 || Win ||align=left| Jason Suttie || K-1 World Grand Prix 2002 Preliminary Melbourne Semifinals || Melbourne, Australia || Decision (Unanimous) || 3 || 3:00
|-
|-  bgcolor="#CCFFCC"
| 2002-02-18 || Win ||align=left| Clay Aumitagi || K-1 World Grand Prix 2002 Preliminary Melbourne Quarterfinals || Melbourne, Australia || TKO || 2 || 1:48
|-
|-  bgcolor="#FFBBBB"
| 2001-12-08 || Loss ||align=left| Mike Bernardo || K-1 World Grand Prix 2001 Reserve fight || Tokyo, Japan || Decision (Unanimous) || 3 || 3:00
|-
|-  bgcolor="#FFBBBB"
| 2001-10-08 || Loss ||align=left| Mark Hunt || K-1 World Grand Prix 2001 in Fukuoka Final || Fukuoka, Japan || TKO (Doctor stoppage) || 3 || 1:38
|-
! style=background:white colspan=9 |
|-
|-  bgcolor="#CCFFCC"
| 2001-10-08 || Win ||align=left| Mike Bernardo || K-1 World Grand Prix 2001 in Fukuoka Semifinals || Fukuoka, Japan || TKO (2 knockdowns/Punch) || 1 || 2:27
|-
|-  bgcolor="#FFBBBB"
| 2001-04-29 || Loss ||align=left| Jérôme Le Banner || K-1 World Grand Prix 2001 in Osaka Final || Osaka, Japan || KO (Punches) || 1 || 0:46
|-
|-  bgcolor="#CCFFCC"
| 2001-04-29 || Win ||align=left| Peter Graham || K-1 World Grand Prix 2001 in Osaka Semifinals || Osaka, Japan || KO (Punch) || 2 || 1:29
|-
|-  bgcolor="#FFBBBB"
| 2001-04-29 || Loss ||align=left| Ray Sefo || K-1 World Grand Prix 2001 in Osaka Quarterfinals || Osaka, Japan || TKO (Right hook) || 1 || 2:20
|-
! style=background:white colspan=9 |
|-
|-  bgcolor="#FFBBBB"
| 1996-06-02 || Loss ||align=left| Perry Teigt || K-1 Fight Night II || Zürich, Switzerland || TKO (Doctor stoppage) || 3 || 1:05
|-
|-  bgcolor="#CCFFCC"
| 1996 || Win ||align=left| Errol Parris || || Sydney, Australia || KO (Left hook) || 2 || 1:14
|-
! style=background:white colspan=9 |

|-  bgcolor="#cfc"
| 1995-10-27 || Win||align=left| Bill Lasfar || Shoot Boxing S-cup BOMBER || Tokyo, Japan || KO  || 2 || 3:40
|-
! style=background:white colspan=9 |

|-  bgcolor="#cfc"
| 1995-08-24 || Win||align=left| Manson Gibson || Shoot Boxing S-CUP Thunder and lightning || Tokyo, Japan || Decision  || 5 || 3:00

|-
|-  bgcolor="#FFBBBB"
| 1994-05-08 || Loss ||align=left| Artem Tonoyan || K-2 Plus Tournament 1994 Quarterfinals || Amsterdam, Netherlands || KO || 1 ||
|-
|-  bgcolor="#FFBBBB"
| 1993-12-29 || Loss ||align=left| Ernesto Hoost || K-2 Grand Prix '93 Semifinals || Tokyo, Japan || TKO (2 knockdowns/Right high kick) || 1 || 2:13 
|-
|-  bgcolor="#CCFFCC"
| 1993-12-29 || Win ||align=left| Bob Zengifo || K-2 Grand Prix '93 Quarterfinals || Tokyo, Japan || KO (Spinning back fist) || 1 || 0:43 
|-
|-  bgcolor="#CCFFCC"
| 1993-11-15 || Win ||align=left| Jan Lomulder || K-1 Andy's Glove || Tokyo, Japan || TKO (Doctor stoppage) || 2 || 2:36 
|-
|-  bgcolor="#CCFFCC"
| 1993-09-04 || Win ||align=left| Gerard Gordeau || K-1 Illusion || Tokyo, Japan || KO (Spinning back fist) || 2 || 2:07 
|-
|-  bgcolor="#CCFFCC"
| 1993-06-25 || Win ||align=left| Lavelle Robinson || K-1 Sanctuary III || Osaka, Japan || Decision (Unanimous) || 5 || 3:00 
|-
! style=background:white colspan=9 |
|-
|-  bgcolor="#CCFFCC"
| 1993-05-22 || Win ||align=left| Kaneko Machida || AJKF Evolution Step-3 || Tokyo, Japan || TKO (Referee stoppage/Right low kick) || 4 || 2:22 
|-
|-  bgcolor="#CCFFCC"
| 1993-03-30 || Win ||align=left| Nobuki Iwashita || Korakuen Experiment: Round 2 || Tokyo, Japan || KO || 1 || 1:56
|-
|-  bgcolor="#CCFFCC"
| 1993-03-30 || Win ||align=left| Shinjiro Aoki || K-1 Sanctuary I || Tokyo, Japan || KO || 1 || 0:40
|-
|-  bgcolor="#FFBBBB"
| 1992-12-11 || Loss ||align=left| Rob Kaman || || Tokyo, Japan || KO || || 
|-
|-  bgcolor="#FFBBBB"
| 1992-10-04 || Loss ||align=left| Stan Longinidis || Seido Kaikan '92 Karate World Cup Kakutogi Olympic III || Japan || TKO (Dislocated shoulder) || 1 ||
|-
! style=background:white colspan=9 |
|-
|-  bgcolor="#FFBBBB"
| 1992-08-29 || Loss ||align=left| Mike Vieira || || San Jose, California || KO (Punch) || 2 || 2:05 
|-
! style=background:white colspan=9 |
|-
|-  bgcolor="#FFBBBB"
| 1992-05-16 || Loss ||align=left| Peter Aerts || Rings Mega Battle 4th || Tokyo, Japan || KO || 2 || 2:46
|-
|-  bgcolor="#FFBBBB"
| 1992-03-26 || Loss ||align=left| Rob Kaman || Seido Kaikan Kakutogi Olympic I  || Tokyo, Japan || KO || 2 || 2:18
|-
|-  bgcolor="#c5d2ea"
| 1992-03-05 || Draw ||align=left| Hans Nyman || Mega Battle II: Ibuki || Amagasaki, Japan || Decision draw || 5 || 3:00
|-
|-
| colspan=9 | Legend:

See also 
List of male kickboxers

References

External links 
 
Fighter's profile: Adam Watt, at K-1 site.

1967 births
People from Manly, New South Wales
Heavyweight boxers
Australian male kickboxers
Cruiserweight kickboxers
Heavyweight kickboxers
Australian male karateka
Seidokaikan practitioners
Living people
Commonwealth Boxing Council champions
Australian male boxers